Ernest Albert Coxhead (1863–1933) was an English-born architect, active in the United States. He was trained in the offices of several English architects and attended the Royal Academy and the Architectural Association School of Architecture, both in London. He moved to California where he was the semi-official architect for the Episcopal Church. At the beginning of his career, Ernest Coxhead focused on designing churches, primarily in the Gothic Revival style. After the mid-1890s, Coxhead focused on residential designs. He was involved in the emergence of the Arts and Crafts style in California. He succeeded in designing residences that incorporated the elements and character of the English country house - shingled, Arts and Crafts style English Vernacular Cottages that combined elements from different periods for dramatic effect.

Early life
Ernest Albert Coxhead was born in Eastbourne, East Sussex, the fourth of six children of William Coxhead, a retired schoolmaster. At the age of 15 Ernest became articled to civil engineer George Wallis. After five years experience in both public projects and residential developments, in 1883 Coxhead left Eastbourne for London. In London he worked for architect Frederic Chancellor, who restored gothic churches.

Los Angeles
Coxhead moved with his older brother, Almeric William Sylvester Coxhead (1862–1928), to Los Angeles, California in 1886, where he established an independent practice, and soon secured commissions to design several Episcopal Churches in Southern California.

San Francisco

Coxhead's success with these projects led to commissions for several more churches in Northern California.  He moved to San Francisco and opened the Coxhead and Coxhead office in 1890, with Almeric as his business partner.  Seventeen Coxhead church buildings were constructed, of which eleven are extant. In 1893 his Episcopal Church client, Bishop William Kip, died and Coxhead started to concentrate on residential work.  His residences include townhouses in San Francisco and large homes in Palo Alto, Alameda, and Berkeley.

From 1918 to 1919, Coxhead went to LeMans, France, to organize and direct the American Expeditionary Force's University School of Architecture, established by John Galen Howard, for members of the United States armed forces stationed in France. He was subsequently appointed Chief of the University Extension Field Work of the Fine Arts Department at the University School of Architecture in Beaune, France.

Coxhead returned to the United States and lived in Berkeley until his death in 1933.  A collection of his work can be found in the Environmental Design Archives at the College of Environmental Design, University of California, Berkeley.

Selected buildings

Residential

Commercial and public

Churches

References

External links
 Finding aid to the Ernest Coxhead Collection Collection at the Environmental Design Archives, University of California, Berkeley
 Description of 53 extant Bay Area buildings by Coxhead (Bay Area Architecture and Public Art Documentation Project)

1863 births
1933 deaths
19th-century English architects
Architects from Sussex
Architecture in the San Francisco Bay Area
Arts and Crafts architects
British emigrants to the United States
Culture of Berkeley, California
People from Eastbourne
19th-century American architects
20th-century American architects